Jack Ferver (born 1979) is an American dancer, choreographer, actor, and professor. They are known for their dance-theatre shows that examine trauma, otherness, and queerness, as well as for their portrayal of a character known as the Little Lad in a 2007 Berries and Cream Starburst commercial.

Upon graduating from Interlochen Arts Academy, Ferver moved to New York City and appeared in their first film role in Outside Providence (1999). After acting in film, television, and theater for several years, Ferver began performing their own full-length dance pieces in 2007. Their work with artist Marc Swanson on the performance piece Chambre in the mid-2010s earned a nomination at the 2016 Bessie Awards. Ferver teaches at Bard College and cohosts a podcast about the dance world.

Early life 
Jack Ferver grew up in rural Wisconsin, U.S., first in Prairie du Sac and later in Sauk City, where they experienced harassment and bullying throughout their youth as "a little gay kid". Ferver began working with a teacher who was influenced by Martha Graham when they were 13. They received a scholarship to Interlochen Arts Academy for their senior year of high school, where they trained and met future collaborator Reid Bartelme.

Career 
After attending Interlochen, Ferver moved to New York City. In 1997, intending to dance and act, Ferver was hired to perform in several commercials as well as for their first film role in Outside Providence (1999). Ferver hoped to land more film roles but had trouble finding a talent agent and recalled rejection from casting directors who had trouble viewing them as a young person, despite being eighteen years old when Outside Providence was filmed. Around this time, they began to take classes at the Martha Graham School of Contemporary Dance.

Ferver continued to appear onstage and act in television and film. In 1999, they performed in the premiere of Betty's Summer Vacation at Playwrights Horizons. In 2000, they appeared on several episodes of the Comedy Central TV series Strangers with Candy. Throughout the early and mid-2000s, Ferver performed in theater, film, and television, appearing in plays in New York, Washington, D.C., and San Diego. In 2001, they appeared in the film Way Off Broadway and in 2005 they performed in the New York Musical Theatre Festival adaptation of the film But I'm a Cheerleader. With the QWAN Company, which Ferver founded, they created and performed in satirical live readings of the films Notes on a Scandal and Black Swan titled Notes!!! (2010) and Swan!!! (2011), respectively.

In 2007, Ferver began performing full-length dance pieces with their work When We Were Young and Filled with Fear. In the late 2000s, they presented their work at Dixon Place (When We Were Young and Meat), Danspace Project (Death Is Certain), and Abrons Arts Center (A Movie Star Needs a Movie), the latter as part of the American Realness Festival. As a dancer and choreographer, Ferver has collaborated with Interlochen classmate Bartelme, dramaturg Joshua Lubin-Levy, and artist Marc Swanson. Chambre, one of Ferver's pieces with Swanson, was nominated in 2016 for a Bessie Award.

Ferver appeared as a character known as the Little Lad in a 2007 commercial for Berries and Cream Starburst candies. The advertisement, which features Ferver performing a simple dance while singing "Berries and cream!", spread widely and generated parodies and mashups on YouTube that year, as did a second video in which Ferver as the Lad led a tutorial for the dance. Ferver briefly revived the character in late 2021 when the tutorial video was reposted to TikTok by podcast host Justin McElroy and the Little Lad dance's became a popular TikTok trend.

As of 2020, Ferver taught at Bard College and was also a visiting professor at New York University. In addition to their dance work, Ferver has appeared in other movies and TV shows, including Gayby (2012) and High Maintenance (2016). Ferver choreographed and appeared as Tinker Bell in Bard College's 2018 production of Leonard Bernstein's musical Peter Pan. They also signed on in 2019 to choreograph Jeremy O. Harris's play A Boy's Company Presents: 'Tell Me If I'm Hurting You''', but the show was postponed due to the COVID-19 pandemic.

Ferver and Bartelme, who had both been fellows at the New York Public Library for the Performing Arts, began hosting the podcast What's Going On with Dance and Stuff in 2017, with a consistent rule of releasing an episode every Friday. Topics discussed, which often tend to be "more about the 'stuff' than the 'dance,'" according to Dance Magazine, include contemporary dance performances, books, Martha Graham, astrology, and Ferver and Bartelme's own work.

 Style 
Ferver is most known for their dance-theatre shows that examine trauma, otherness, and queerness. In interviews, Ferver has cited Martha Graham and her autobiography Blood Memory as a particular influence in their exploration of concepts like "contraction and release", dark facets of the human psyche, as well as ritual and repetition. Expression of gender and sexuality are central themes throughout Ferver's work. Their piece Two Alike, described as a "psycho-sexual semi-autobiographical choreographic piece" explored their childhood through repetition. In Everything Is Imaginable'', Ferver choreographed four soloists to "collectively exhume their personal queer histories and celebrate their childhood icons."

Personal life
In 2008, Ferver lived in Brooklyn, New York. Their partner is filmmaker and artist Jeremy Jacob.

Performances

Dance

Theater

Film

Television

Notes

References

External links 
 
 
 
 ,

LGBT choreographers
LGBT theatre directors
American contemporary dancers
American choreographers
American performance artists
Living people
21st-century American dancers
Queer artists
Queer actors
American film actors
American stage actors
American television actors
21st-century American academics
Bard College faculty
People from Prairie du Sac, Wisconsin
People from Sauk City, Wisconsin
Artists from Brooklyn
Artists from Wisconsin
Actors from New York City
Actors from Wisconsin
Interlochen Center for the Arts alumni
1979 births